Udayamperoor Ekadasi Perumthrikovil Temple is an ancient Hindu temple dedicated to Shiva at Udayamperoor of Ernakulam District in Kerala state in India. This temple is a classic example of the architectural style of Kerala and has monumental towers and Round Sanctum Sanctorum. One of the big Siva temples in Kerala, the Udayamperoor Temple has a courtyard of about four acres of land. The Mukha Mandapa - the first chamber is built in shaped kerala-dravidian architecture. According to folklore, sage Parashurama has installed the idol. The temple is a part of the 108 famous Shiva temples in Kerala.

See also
 108 Shiva Temples
 Temples of Kerala

References

108 Shiva Temples
Shiva temples in Kerala
Hindu temples in Kochi